Cecil John Wood (1874 – 27 April 1957)  was the fourth Anglican Bishop of Melanesia, serving from 1912 to 1919.

Wood was educated at St Peter's College, Oxford and ordained in 1897. He held curacies at High Halden, St Marylebone, and Bethnal Green before becoming Vicar of Wimbledon in 1906. Six years later he became Bishop of Melanesia, serving for seven years. He resigned his See effective 31 December 1918.

Returning to England he was Rector of Witnesham,  1919–1924; and undertook occasional episcopal duties, including as archbishop's commissary (i.e. acting diocesan bishop) in 1921. He was then appointed Vicar of Jesmond and an Assistant Bishop of Newcastle from 1924 to 1933. He was Rural Dean of Horsham from 1934 to 1940 and then Rector of West Grinstead until retirement in 1946.

He married Margorie Allen Bell, the sister of George Bell, Bishop of Chichester (1929–58). He died in 1957, aged 82.

References

1874 births
1957 deaths
Alumni of St Peter's College, Oxford
Anglican bishops of Melanesia
People from West Grinstead